Andreas Baum (born 5 July 1978, in Kassel) is a German politician and former member of the Pirate Party Berlin, which is a branch of the national Pirate Party. He entered the state parliament of Berlin when the Pirate party won 15 seats in the 2011 Berlin state election.

References 

Members of the Abgeordnetenhaus of Berlin
Pirate Party Germany politicians
LGBT legislators in Germany
Living people
1978 births
21st-century German LGBT people